Vishnevite, or sulfatic cancrinite, is a mineral of the cancrinite group with the chemical formula (Na, Ca, K)6(Si, Al)12O24[(SO4),(CO3), Cl2]2-4·nH2O. It has hexagonal crystals.

References

External links
Mindat data

Cancrinite group
Hexagonal minerals
Minerals in space group 173